Kelechi is a Name given by the Majority Eastern People of Nigeria, THE IGBO's. The Name means "THANK GOD" and it is given to either Male or Female. The Anambra People of the Igbo's also name "KENECHUKWU" with short form being "KENECHI". Notable people with the given name include:

Kelechi Francis Ibekwe (born 1984), Nigerian footballer
Kelechi Iheanacho (footballer, born 1981), Nigerian footballer
Kelechi Iheanacho (born 1996), Nigerian footballer
Kelechi Okoye (born 1984), Nigerian footballer
Kelechi Osemele (born 1989), American football player
Kelechi Osunwa (born 1984), Nigerian footballer

See also
Susan Kelechi Watson, American actress
Kelechi, Nigerian American Rapper